The TORRO tornado intensity scale (or T-Scale) is a scale measuring tornado intensity between T0 and T11. It was proposed by Terence Meaden of the Tornado and Storm Research Organisation (TORRO), a meteorological organisation in the United Kingdom, as an extension of the Beaufort scale.

History and derivation from Beaufort scale 
The scale was tested from 1972 to 1975 and was made public at a meeting of the Royal Meteorological Society in 1975. The scale sets T0 as the equivalent of 8 on the Beaufort scale and is related to the Beaufort scale (B), up to 12 on the Beaufort scale, by the formula:

 B = 2 (T + 4)

and conversely:

 T = (B/2 - 4)

The Beaufort scale was first introduced in 1805, and in 1921 quantified. It expresses the wind speed as faster than v in the formula:

 v = 0.837 B3/2 m/s

TORRO scale formula 
Most UK tornadoes are T6 or below with the strongest known UK tornado estimated as a T8 (the London tornado of 1091). For comparison, the strongest detected winds in a United States tornado (during the 1999 Oklahoma tornado outbreak) would be T11 using the following formulae:

 v = 2.365 (T+4)3/2 m/s
 v = 8.511 (T+4)3/2 km/h
 v = 5.289 (T+4)3/2 mph
 v = 4.596 (T+4)3/2 kn

where v is wind speed and T is TORRO intensity number. Wind speed is defined as a 3-second gust at 10 m AGL.

Alternatively, the T-Scale formula may be expressed as:

 v = 0.837 (2T+8)3/2 m/s
or
 v = 0.837(23/2) (T+4)3/2 m/s
 or

Rating process and comparisons to Fujita scale 
TORRO claims it differs from the Fujita scale in that it is "purely" a wind speed scale, whereas the Fujita scale relies on damage for classification, but in practice, damage is utilised almost exclusively in both systems to infer intensity. That is because such a proxy for intensity is usually all that is available, although users of both scales would prefer direct, objective, quantitative measurements. The scale is primarily used in the United Kingdom whereas the Fujita scale has been the primary scale used in North America, continental Europe, and the rest of the world.

At the 2004 European Conference on Severe Storms, Dr. Meaden proposed a unification of the TORRO and Fujita scales as the Tornado Force or TF Scale. In 2007 in the United States, the Enhanced Fujita Scale replaced the original Fujita Scale from 1971. It made substantial improvements in standardizing damage descriptors through expanding and refining damage indicators and associated degrees of damage, as well as calibrated tornado wind speeds to better match the associated damage. However, the EF Scale is biased to US construction practices. As of 2014, only the United States and Canada have adopted the EF scale.

Unlike with the F scale, no analyses have been undertaken at all to establish the veracity and accuracy of the T scale damage descriptors. The scale was written in the early 1970s, and does not take into account changes such as the growth in weight of vehicles or the great reduction in numbers and change of type of railway locomotives, and was written in an environment where tornadoes of F2 or stronger are extremely rare, so little or no first-hand investigation of actual damage at the upper end of the scale was possible. The TORRO scale has more graduations than the F scale which makes it arguably more useful for tornadoes on the lower end of the scale; however, such accuracy and precision are not typically attainable in practice. Brooks and Doswell stated that "the problems associated with damage surveys and uncertainties associated with estimating wind speed from observed damage make highly precise assignments dubious". In survey reports, Fujita ratings sometimes also have extra qualifications added ("minimal F2" or "upper-end F3 damage"), made by investigators who have experience of many similar tornadoes and relating to the fact that the F scale is a damage scale, not a wind speed scale.

Tornadoes are rated after they have passed and have been examined, not whilst in progress. In rating the intensity of a tornado, both direct measurements and inferences from empirical observations of the effects of a tornado are used. Few anemometers are struck by a tornado, and even fewer survive, so there are very few in-situ measurements. Therefore, almost all ratings are obtained from remote sensing techniques or as proxies from damage surveys. Weather radar is used when available, and sometimes photogrammetry or videogrammetry estimates wind speed by measuring tracers in the vortex. In most cases, aerial and ground damage surveys of structures and vegetation are utilised, sometimes with engineering analysis. Also sometimes available are ground swirl patterns (cycloidal marks) left in the wake of a tornado. If an on site analysis is not possible, either for retrospective ratings or when personnel cannot reach a site, photographs, videos, or descriptions of damage may be utilised.

TORRO scale parameters 
The 12 categories for the TORRO scale are listed below, in order of increasing intensity. Although the wind speeds and photographic damage examples are updated, which are more or less still accurate. However, for the actual TORRO scale in practice, damage indicators (the type of structure which has been damaged) are predominantly used in determining the tornado intensity.

See also 
 Saffir-Simpson Hurricane Scale
 Tornado intensity and damage
 Wind engineering
 List of tornadoes and tornado outbreaks

References

External links 
 TORRO Tornado Intensity Scale (TORRO)
 T-Scale Origins and Scientific Basis (TORRO)
 Wind speed scales: Beaufort, T Scale, and Fujita's Scale (TORRO)
 Determination of tornado or downburst intensity (TorDACH)

Hazard scales
Wind
Tornado
Scales in meteorology